Hansonthrips is a genus of thrips in the family Phlaeothripidae.

Species
 Hansonthrips drymus
 Hansonthrips selvae

References

Phlaeothripidae
Thrips
Thrips genera